Alexander Yuryevich Sharapov (born 6 March 1994) is a Russian track racing cyclist.

He participated at the 2019 UCI Track Cycling World Championships, winning a medal.

References

External links

1994 births
Living people
Cyclists from Moscow
Russian male cyclists
Russian track cyclists
European Games competitors for Russia
Cyclists at the 2019 European Games
21st-century Russian people